Scott Andrew Cooksey (born 24 June 1972 in Birmingham) is an English former professional footballer who played as a goalkeeper. During his career, he played for several professional and semi-professional clubs, including Derby County, Shrewsbury Town, Peterborough United, Hednesford Town, and Hereford United. His career was terminated prematurely during the 2001–02 season after a wrist injury.

Early career
Cooksey started his professional career at Derby County in 1988 before spending half a season at Shrewsbury Town after two and a half seasons with the Rams. He was unable to break into the first squad at either club. Cooksey then joined Bromsgrove Rovers and started to attract the attention of the professional ranks with stints at West Ham and Sheffield United. Cooksey eventually moved to Peterborough United in 1993. However, at Peterborough, Cooksey was restricted to being an understudy to Fred Barber and started 20 first team-games. During this period, Cooksey also had successful loan stints at non-league sides Welling United and Stalybridge Celtic.

Hednesford Town
Cooksey's big footballing break came in July 1995, when John Baldwin, then manager of non-league Hednesford Town, signed Cooksey from Peterborough. Hednesford had recently won promotion to the Football Conference, and Cooksey was to establish himself as one of the team's star players as Hednesford established itself as one of the country's top non-league sides during the mid-1990s. During his three and a half years at the club, Cooksey was almost an ever-present first-choice goalkeeper.

Among the highlights of his time at Hednesford included a famous FA Cup run during the 1996–97 season, which saw Hednesford progress from the early qualifying stages to the Fourth Round proper.

Cooksey was to play a pivotal role as Hednesford beat Blackpool 1–0 at Bloomfield Road in the second round, as he produced a series of breathtaking saves, with Hednesford holding onto a late 1–0 lead.

After defeating York City 1–0 at Keys Park, Cooksey starred in one of Hednesford's most famous matches, a narrow 3–2 defeat to Premiership side Middlesbrough at the Riverside Stadium. However, Hednesford was far from disgraced, as they gave their Premiership opponents a scare, taking a sensational early lead, and leading for most of the first half before two late goals finally killed off The Pitmen.

Cooksey and Hednesford's FA Cup heroics continued into 1997–98, as they beat Hull City 2–0 at Boothferry Park in a match filmed live for Match of the Day.

Given Hednesford's run of good form during the mid-1990s, it was of little surprise that several Football League clubs showed an interest in Cooksey, and his last few months at Hednesford were riddled with speculations of a transfer to a higher league. He was also called up to the England semi-professional side, making two appearances.

Shrewsbury Town
In October 1998, Shrewsbury Town manager Jake King signed Cooksey from Hednesford for £15,000. Cooksey had been a squad member at Shrewsbury during part of the 1992–93 season, and he was hoping to make an impact at Gay Meadow following his successful stint at Hednesford.

He did not enjoy the same amount of success with Shrewsbury Town. The club was entering a mediocre period of its history, and struggled to remain in the Football League. Shrewsbury's first-choice goalkeeper Paul Edwards was one of the more vital team members, and Cooksey struggled to dislodge him as first-choice keeper. His first-team debut was against Cardiff City at Ninian Park, where he gifted Cardiff their opening goal as he dropped a crossed ball, Cardiff eventually winning 3–0.

He was only to make one more league appearance, a 3–2 win against Hull City at Gay Meadow, and an appearance in the Associate Members Cup.

Late in 1999, Jake King was sacked, and Kevin Ratcliffe was appointed as manager. His position at the club was further compromised as Ratcliffe signed former Liverpool trainee Ian Dunbavin as second-choice keeper, leaving Cooksey to find a place elsewhere.

Hereford United
In January 2000, Hereford United, then of the Football Conference, signed Cooksey on loan from Shrewsbury. With Cooksey once again an automatic first choice, he was a hit at Edgar Street and was signed on a free transfer in the summer of 2000. He quickly established himself as a fans favourite, with his passionate displays.

Cooksey was a first team regular as Hereford pushed for promotion from the Football Conference. Whilst 'The Bulls' were not be promoted during Cooksey's stay, he became well regarded at the club, establishing himself as the first choice goalkeeper. It was during this spell that Cooksey also won the accolade of being first choice goalkeeper in the England semi-professional squad earning a further two caps.

Late in 2001 Cooksey picked up a wrist injury, and received an injection in order for him to complete the season. The injury was to become infected, and Cooksey missed the entire 2001–02 season. The severity of the potentially life-threatening condition meant a three-week spell in hospital with blood poisoning which had destroyed his wrist ligaments and severely weakening it.

Bravely, Cooksey attempted to battle back to fitness, and returned to football in January 2002 with a solitary appearance on the bench in the FA Trophy replay against Chesham United. He was never able to fully recover from the wrist injury, and with the need for further complicated operations he opted to retire from professional football in February 2002, aged 29.

Coaching and management
Since retiring from football, Cooksey has successfully forged a career in education in his home town of Birmingham. He has also been involved in junior football in and around step 7 and managed Cradley in the Alliance during the 2006–07 campaign getting to the 4th round of the FA Vase. In November 2014, he was appointed joint manager alongside Barry Dedman of Midland League side Pelsall Villa. With Dedman's work commitments Cooksey took over the reins after saving Pelsall from relegation. The 2015–16 campaign Cooksey made the club more competitive but parted company in early February 2016 due to ill health.

References

External links
Cooksey reveals injury shock

1972 births
Footballers from Birmingham, West Midlands
Living people
English footballers
England semi-pro international footballers
Association football goalkeepers
Derby County F.C. players
Shrewsbury Town F.C. players
Bromsgrove Rovers F.C. players
Peterborough United F.C. players
Stalybridge Celtic F.C. players
Welling United F.C. players
Hednesford Town F.C. players
Weymouth F.C. players
Hereford United F.C. players
English Football League players
National League (English football) players